Alexandria Hospital may refer to:

 Inova Alexandria Hospital, Alexandria, Virginia, United States
 Alexandria Hospital Nevis, Saint Kitts and Nevis